CollabFeature is a group of independent filmmakers from all over the world who have come together to create feature films made up of multiple individual stories.  Each filmmaker writes and directs their own small segment of a film in their own country. The group's first feature, The Owner, began shooting in spring of 2010 and was completed in 2012. The project was created by Detroit-based filmmaker Marty Shea and web developer Ian Bonner.

The Owner 
CollabFeature's first multi-director project was a feature film entitled The Owner. The story follows a lost backpack that travels the globe on a journey to find its owner, a man named "MacGuffin." As the story progresses, we learn details about the mysterious man to whom the bag belongs. The film brings together a variety of cultures, languages and film styles into a singular narrative plot.

The feature consists of 25 brief segments that are connected by the backpack's journey. Each short film is approximately 2 to 5 minutes long.

With its 28 directors (including the three additional directors), The Owner had more directors than Paris je t'aime, which currently holds the Guinness World Record for the most directors (21) on one film.

The Owner premiered on May 25, 2012 around the world.

Train Station 
CollabFeature's second multi-director project was a feature film entitled Train Station, about possibilities and choices. Filmed in 25 countries, 40 filmmakers collaboratively wrote and assembled it via CollabFeature, the world's first Internet collaboration of its kind.

The film follows a single, unnamed character played by 43 different actors from different parts of the world. Every time the character is confronted with a choice, the film cuts to a new actor in a new city.  A new director continues the story. The character, who always wears brown, switches ages, genders and nationalities. Every time the Character in Brown reaches the end of a story path, the film backs up to a previous choice and a new director takes us down a different path to explore "what would have happened if..."

 Premiere at East Lansing Film Festival, Michigan, US, November 6, 2015
 Sudan Independent Film Festival
 Berlin Independent Film Festival, February 17, 2016
 Washington DC Film Festival, March 10, 2016

Filmmakers
 Marty Shea - Detroit, US
 Rafael Yoshida - São Paulo
 Fahad Shaikh - Dubai
 Sabine Sebaali - Beirut
 Steve Murphy - London
 Varun Mathur - New Delhi
 Brian Shephard - Orlando, Florida
 Asmit Pathare - Mumbai
 Nicolas Fogliarini - Paris
 Neha Raheja Thakker - Mumbai
 Vishesh Mankal - New Delhi
 Francois Coetzee -  Cape Town
 Mairtin de Barra - Dublin
 Xavier Agudo - Berlin
 Yango González - Bogota, Colombia
 Alexander Schoenauer - Berlin
 Nino Leitner - Innsbruck, Austria
 Arne von Nostitz-Rieneck - Vienna
 Reenita Malhotra - Hong Kong
 Michael Canzoniero - New York City
 Nicole Sylvester - Brooklyn
 John Versical - Chicago
 Ingrid FRANCHI - Paris, France
 Todd Felderstein - Los Angeles
 Prashant Sehgal - New Delhi
 Craig Lines - Newcastle, England

External links
 http://www.collabfeature.com
 https://web.archive.org/web/20151223040119/http://elff.com/Films/train-station/

References

Collaborative projects